The East Moreton colonial by-election, 1868 was a by-election held on 23 December 1868 in the electoral district of East Moreton for the Queensland Legislative Assembly.

History
On 11 December 1868, John Douglas, member for East Moreton, resigned. Henry Jordan won the resulting by-election on 23 December 1868.

See also
 Members of the Queensland Legislative Assembly, 1868–1870

References

1868 elections in Australia
Queensland state by-elections
1860s in Queensland